Eduard Aghvani Nalbandian (born July 16, 1956) is an Armenian diplomat who served as Minister of Foreign Affairs of Armenia from April 2008 to May 2018.

Biography 
Edward Nalbandian was born in 1956 in Yerevan, Armenian SSR. At the age of 22 he graduated from Moscow State Institute of International Relations. In 1988 he received his Ph.D. in Political Science from the Institute of Oriental Studies of the USSR National Academy of Sciences. Nalbandian speaks Armenian, French, English, Russian and Arabic. He is married and has a daughter.

Diplomatic career
Nalbandian started his diplomatic career in 1978. After obtaining his doctorate degree in political science, Nalbandian was sent first to Lebanon as a diplomat and then, in 1986, appointed First Secretary of the USSR Embassy in Egypt. In 1982, Nalbandian was the youngest diplomat in the Soviet Union to be awarded the highest diplomatic medal for his service, the Peoples Friendship Medal, the USSR's third highest honor. When Armenia became independent, Nalbandian was invited to become Armenia's representative in Egypt. Thus, in 1992 Edward Nalbandian joined the diplomatic service of newly independent Armenia as Chargé d'Affaires and later in 1994 as Ambassador of Armenia to Egypt. From Cairo he was also accredited as Armenia's Ambassador to Morocco and Oman. By October 1992, Nalbandian had established an embassy in Cairoone of the first embassies Armenia opened.

In 1999 Nalbandian was appointed as Ambassador to France, where he served for almost a decade. This period marked the flourishing of Armenian-French interstate relations, marked notably by the state visits of the Presidents and the Year of Armenia in France. Edward Nalbandian also served as non-resident Ambassador to Israel, the Vatican and Andorra, and he was personal representative of the President of Armenia to the International organization of La Francophonie from 20062008. Edward Nalbandian represented Armenia in several dozens of international conferences and summits.

After Serzh Sargsyan took office as President, he appointed Nalbandian as Foreign Minister from April 14, 2008 till May 2018.

Honors, Honorary titles and awards 
Edward Nalbandian has received a number of awards, among them:

 1982 – The USSR award of Friendship of Nations
 2001 – Commander of the Legion of Honor of the French Republic
 2001 – Armenian Medal of Mkhitar Gosh for significant services in the sphere of diplomacy
 2003 – Saint Gregory's Grand Cross Order of Holy See
 2011 – Grand Officier de la Légion d'honneur
 2012 – 2nd degree medal “For Services Contributed to the Motherland”
 2014 – Honorary Doctorate degree of the Moscow State Institute of International Relations (MGIMO) for his contribution to strengthening international security, and his ongoing contribution to Russia-Armenia relations.
 2015 – La Grande Médaille de la Ville de Paris
 2015 – 1st degree medal “For Services Contributed to the Motherland”, Armenia
 2016 – Gold Medal of the Human Rights League of Spain
 2016 – "Order of Friendship" of the Russian Federation
 2016 – Order Pro Merito Melitensi, The Sovereign Military Hospitaller Order of Saint John of Jerusalem of Rhodes and of Malta
 2016 – Honorary Professor of Yerevan State University.
 2017 – Russian Order of Friendship awarded by Foreign Minister Sergey Lavrov, for his great contribution to strengthening friendship and cooperation with Russia.

See also
List of foreign ministers in 2018
List of Ministers of Foreign Affairs of Armenia

References

External links

Official website of MFA RA

1956 births
Ambassadors of Armenia to Andorra
Ambassadors of Armenia to Egypt
Ambassadors of Armenia to France
Ambassadors of Armenia to Israel
Ambassadors of Armenia to Morocco
Ambassadors of Armenia to Oman
Ambassadors of Armenia to the Holy See
Government ministers of Armenia
Foreign ministers of Armenia
Living people
Grand Officers of the Ordre national du Mérite
Recipients of the Order pro Merito Melitensi
People from Yerevan